Mark Montgomery (born August 30, 1990) is a minor league baseball pitcher who is a free agent.

A native of Williamsburg, Virginia, Montgomery attended Bruton High School, and was drafted by the Yankees out of Longwood University in the 11th round of the 2011 MLB draft. He won the Yankees' Kevin Lawn Award for 2012.

Career

New York Yankees
Montgomery began his career with the Class A- Staten Island Yankees of the New York–Penn League in 2011 where he pitched four games before being promoted to the Class A Charleston RiverDogs for the rest of the year. Between the two teams, he had a 1.91 ERA, 51 strikeouts, 13 walks, and 15 saves in 26 games with 28.1 innings pitched, with no win-loss record.

The next year, Montgomery pitched for the Yankees' A+ and AA teams, the Tampa Yankees and Trenton Thunder. He went 7-2 with a stellar 1.54 ERA in 46 games/64.1 innings pitched with 99 strikeouts, 22 walks, and 15 saves once again.

In 2013, Montgomery started the year with the AAA club of the Yankees, the Scranton/Wilkes-Barre RailRiders. Besides a four-game stint with the GCL Yankees, he spent the whole season with the RailRiders. For the season, his ERA regressed slightly from his first two years, settling at a still-respectable 3.38 in 29 games (four of which were starts with the GCL Yankees) and 45.1 innings pitched to go along with his 59 strikeouts, 25 walks, and 2-3 record.

Montgomery's 2014 season was split between Trenton and Scranton/Wilkes-Barre, with 17 appearances in AA and 22 in AAA. For the season between the two teams, he held a 2-1 record, 2.10 ERA (including a microscopic 0.81 for Trenton), 51 strikeouts, 26 walks, and 4 saves in 51.1 innings pitched.

Detroit Tigers
Montgomery signed a minor league contract with the Detroit Tigers on November 25, 2017. The deal included an invitation to the Tigers' 2018 spring training camp. Montgomery was assigned to the Triple-A Toledo Mud Hens, where he made 12 appearances with a 1.98 ERA in  innings pitched. He was released on July 8, 2018, reportedly after suffering a potentially season-ending elbow injury.

Boston Red Sox
On July 20, 2018, Montgomery signed with the Boston Red Sox, in a minor league deal to run through the 2019 season. In August, Montgomery pitched for the Gulf Coast League Red Sox and the Class A-Advanced Salem Red Sox on rehabilitation assignments, making two relief appearances with each team and allowing a total of four earned runs in  innings pitched.

Montgomery started the 2019 season on the injured list with the Triple-A Pawtucket Red Sox. He was released from the Red Sox organization on May 16, 2019.

References

Further reading
Mark Montgomery could slide into Yankees bullpen on can't-hit pitch from New York Daily News
Striking Out the Side, and Then Some from The New York Times
Yankees relief prospect Mark Montgomery uses 'unhittable' slider to rise through minors from NJ.com
Yankees name Tyler Austin and Mark Montgomery "Kevin Lawn Award" Winners from NJ.com

External links

SoxProspects.com

1990 births
Living people
Baseball players from Virginia
Charleston RiverDogs players
Gulf Coast Red Sox players
Gulf Coast Yankees players
Leones del Caracas players
American expatriate baseball players in Venezuela
Longwood Lancers baseball players
Memphis Redbirds players
Salem Red Sox players
Sportspeople from Williamsburg, Virginia
Scottsdale Scorpions players
Scranton/Wilkes-Barre RailRiders players
Staten Island Yankees players
Tampa Yankees players
Toledo Mud Hens players
Trenton Thunder players